"Sunburn" is a song by American rock band Fuel. It was released in 1999 as the third single from their debut studio album Sunburn. It spent 9 weeks on the Billboard Alternative Songs chart in 1999, peaking at No. 31.

The album version of the song was featured on the Scream 3 movie soundtrack Scream 3: The Album. A live acoustic version was also featured on the charitable album Live in the X Lounge.

"Sunburn" was released as second track on a double A-side maxi single "Shimmer / Sunburn" in Australia on May 7, 1999. It spent 29 weeks on Australian charts, reaching No. 16 in August 1999.

Track listing

Radio promo (1999)
Sunburn (radio mix) – 3:59
Sunburn (album version) – 4:23

Maxi single (Australia)
Shimmer – 3:34
Sunburn – 4:25
Shimmer (acoustic) – 3:20
Sunday Girl – 3:16
Walk The Sky – 3:20

Charts

References

External links
Fuel Shimmer / Sunburn @Discogs.com

1998 songs
1999 singles
Fuel (band) songs
Songs written by Carl Bell (musician)
550 Music singles